James B. Whiteside (born 1984), is an American ballet dancer, choreographer, model, drag queen, and recording artist. He is a former principal dancer with Boston Ballet and is currently a principal dancer with American Ballet Theatre.

Early life and training 
Whiteside was born in Fairfield, Connecticut. He grew up in Fairfield and in Bridgeport. He began his dance training at the D’Valda & Sirico Dance and Music Centre when he was nine years old. He began training in jazz, tap, and acrobatic dance and did not begin studying classical ballet until he was a teenager. He later attended the Virginia School of the Arts and trained under the direction of Petrus Bosman and David Keener.

Career

Ballet 
In 2002 he joined Boston Ballet II, eventually joining the corps de ballet of Boston Ballet in 2003. He was promoted to soloist in 2006, first soloist in 2008, and principal dancer with Boston Ballet in 2009. Whiteside left Boston Ballet and joined American Ballet Theatre as a soloist in September 2012. He was promoted to principal dancer in October 2013.

He performed with the National Ballet of Canada as a guest artist and was featured in Justin Peck's short film Early Sunday Morning, which premiered at the Tribeca Film Festival. In 2018, he starred in Arthur Pita’s dance/theater work The Tenant at The Joyce Theater in New York City.

In 2019, his choreographed work New American Romance debuted in 2019.

Whiteside hosts his own podcast series on Premier Dance Network called The Stage Rightside with James Whiteside.

Modeling 
Whiteside is represented by Wilhelmina Models and has modeled for Marc Jacobs, Capezio, Koio shoes, MAC, and Glossier.

Music 
Whiteside records electronic pop, rap, and dance hall music under the stage name JbDubs. He writes and produces his own music and directs, choreographs, and produces his own music videos. The music video for his single I Hate My Job has been featured on PerezHilton.com, HuffPost, After Elton, Instinct, Shangay Spain, Up2U Thailand, and MTV3. His music has also been featured on the Here TV network shows BOOMBOX and She's Living for This.

Whiteside released his debut album Free To Love in 2011. His second album, titled Oink, was released in 2012. In 2013 he released an extended play titled Hey JB!

Drag 
Whiteside performs as a drag queen in New York City's drag scene under the stage name Ühu Betch. He is a member of a drag ensemble called Dairy Queens. He has his own line of clothing at Drag Queen Merch.

Selected repertoire

Boston Ballet
Theme and Variations
Coppélia
Rubies
Tschaikovsky Pas de Deux
Serenade
A Midsummer Night’s Dream
La Valse
Maina Gielgud's Giselle
Mikko Nissinen’s The Nutcracker
Mikko Nissinen’s Swan Lake
John Cranko’s Romeo and Juliet
Marius Petipa’s The Sleeping Beauty
Jiři Kylián’s Bella Figura
Jiři Kylián’s Petite Mort
Mark Morris’ Drink to Me Only With Thine Eyes
Jorma Elo’s Carmen

American Ballet Theatre
Solor in La Bayadère
The Prince in Frederick Ashton’s Cinderella
Conrad and Ali, the Slave in Le Corsaire
Basilio and Espada in Don Quixote
Oberon in The Dream
Colas in La Fille mal gardée
Albrecht in Giselle
Lescaut in Manon
The Nutcracker Prince in Alexei Ratmansky’s The Nutcracker

Prince Gremin in OneginRomeo in Romeo and JulietPrince Désiré in The Sleeping BeautyPrince Siegfried and von Rothbart (Ballroom) in Swan LakeOrion in SylviaTschaikovsky Pas de DeuxPrince Coffee in Whipped CreamBach PartitaSymphonic VariationsSymphony in CTheme and VariationsDrink to Me Only With Thine EyesCreated roles
The Man in AfterEffectHarlequin in Ratmansky’s HarlequinadeDionysius in Of Love and RageZephyr in The SeasonsAFTERITEGarden BlueSerenade after Plato’s SymposiumA Time There WasWith a Chance of RainDream within a Dream (deferred)Choreographed worksCity of Women for ABT IncubatorSway for Lincoln Center’s Midsummer Night’s SwingNew American Romance'' for American Ballet Theatre

Source:

Personal life 
Whiteside lived in Manhattan with Dan Donigan, his partner of 12 years. He and Donigan were in an open relationship. The couple ended their relationship in October 2020.

In 2021, he started dating Augie Schott.

References

External links 
 
 James Whiteside at American Ballet Theatre

Living people
1984 births
American Ballet Theatre principal dancers
American drag queens
American male ballet dancers
American male models
American male pop singers
Boston Ballet principal dancers
Boston Ballet II dancers
Dancers from Connecticut
LGBT people from Connecticut
American LGBT musicians
People from Fairfield, Connecticut
Gay models
LGBT dancers